John Joseph Marchi (May 20, 1921 – April 25, 2009) was an American attorney and jurist who represented Staten Island in the New York State Senate for 50 years. Marchi (pronounced MAR-key), a Republican, retired on December 31, 2006, from the seat that he had held since January 1, 1957. He was the Republican nominee for Mayor of New York City in 1969 and 1973.

Personal life
He attended parochial schools on Staten Island before graduating with honors from Manhattan College in 1942. Marchi subsequently earned a J.D. from St. John's University School of Law in 1950 and a J.S.D. from Brooklyn Law School in 1953. In World War II, he served with the Coast Guard on antisubmarine duty in the Atlantic and with the Navy in the Okinawa campaign in the Pacific. Marchi also served as a Commander in the Active Reserve after the war, retiring from the service in 1982.

On October 19, 2006, the 85-year-old Marchi passed out and fell from his chair at the annual Alfred E. Smith Dinner at the Waldorf-Astoria.

Marchi died on April 25, 2009, due to complications of pneumonia, while vacationing in Lucca, Italy, with his wife and other family members.

Professional Life 
Marchi was first elected on November 6, 1956, after having served as a Senate aide. He was a member of the New York State Senate from 1957 to 2006, sitting in the 171st, 172nd, 173rd, 174th, 175th, 176th, 177th, 178th, 179th, 180th, 181st, 182nd, 183rd, 184th, 185th, 186th, 187th, 188th, 189th, 190th, 191st, 192nd, 193rd, 194th, 195th and 196th New York State Legislatures.

Marchi was active in conservative issues, particularly of a fiscal nature, during his long Senate tenure. Marchi wrote the state laws to help New York City recover from its fiscal crisis and near bankruptcy in the 1970s.

Marchi ran twice for Mayor of New York City. He won a surprise upset over Mayor John V. Lindsay in the 1969 Republican primary. He ran in the general election against Lindsay, who was still the Liberal Party nominee, and Democratic Comptroller Mario Procaccino. Marchi and Procaccino lost to Lindsay.

Marchi was the Republican nominee again in 1973, but he lost to Comptroller Abraham D. Beame, the Democrat that Lindsay had defeated in 1965, while he came in ahead of Mario Biaggi and Albert H. Blumenthal. Previously, he ran unsuccessfully as the Republican nominee for Borough President of Staten Island in 1961.

Marchi worked to improve public education in the 1980s and was appointed as Chairman of the Temporary State Commission on New York City School Governance in 1989. This commission conducted a two-year study on the control and governance in New York City schools and provided recommendations to the New York State Legislature on improving administration and public participation in the school system. Senator Marchi also provided assistance to the College of Staten Island so that the school could obtain the land of the former Willowbrook State School for a campus.

Marchi was a longtime advocate for the secession of Staten Island from New York City. He wrote a law which backed a secession referendum in 1993. While the referendum passed, the legislature has not allowed Staten Island to become its own city. As a part of his Staten Island secession work, Marchi drafted a model charter for a new City of Staten Island. Marchi also drafted the law to close the Fresh Kills Landfill on Staten Island.

Marchi was the only Republican member of the State Senate who opposed the death penalty.

Marchi was a member of the executive committee and the Board of Governors of the Council of State Governments. He was appointed by U.S. President Richard M. Nixon to the National Advisory Committee on Drug Abuse Prevention.

Senate leadership positions
Chairman of the Joint Liquor Laws Committee
Chairman of the Senate Commerce and Navigation Committee
Chairman of the Joint New York City Docks Committee
Chairman of the Joint Alcoholic Beverage Control Law Committee
Chairman of the Senate Constitutional Affairs Subcommittee
Chairman of the Senate City of New York Committee
Chairman of the Joint Intergovernmental Cooperation Committee
Chairman of the Senate Finance Committee
Chairman of the Senate Corporations, Authorities and Commissions Committee
Vice President Pro Tempore of the Senate
Chairman of the Temporary State Commission on New York City School Governance
Chairman of the New York State Charter Commission for Staten Island
Chairman of the Staten Island Charter Commission
Deputy Majority Leader for Intergovernmental Relations
Chairman of the Senate Ethics Committee
Assistant Majority Whip
Assistant Majority Leader for Conference Operations
Chairman of the Senate Task Force on World Trade Center Recovery

Legacy 
A new Staten Island Ferry boat was named in Marchi's honor in 2006.

John Marchi Hall was named in his honor on campus of the College of Staten Island in 2006. The building is located in the "north" side of campus; building 2N.

A collection of Marchi's legislative and personal files are available at the College of Staten Island Archives and Special Collections.

References

External links
Senator John J. Marchi Papers at The College of Staten Island Archives and Special Collections   
State's Senior Legislator Set To Retire
Senator John J. Marchi's Official Retirement Statement
Retired State Sen. John Marchi of Staten Island dies – Staten Island Advance – Sunday, April 26, 2009
John J. Marchi, Who Fought for Staten Island in Senate, Dies at 87 – New York Times – Sunday, April 26, 2009
 

 

1921 births
2009 deaths
American people of Italian descent
United States Coast Guard personnel of World War II
Republican Party New York (state) state senators
Brooklyn Law School alumni
20th-century American politicians
Politicians from Staten Island
United States Navy personnel of World War II
Candidates in the 1973 United States elections
People from Staten Island